Rice wine is a generic term for an alcoholic beverage fermented and possibly distilled from rice, traditionally consumed in East Asia, Southeast Asia and South Asia. Rice wine is made by the fermentation of rice starch that has been converted to sugars. Microbes are the source of the enzymes that convert the starches to sugar. Sake in Japan, Mijiu in China, and Cheongju and Makgeolli in Korea are some of the most notable types of rice wine. 

Rice wine typically has an alcohol content of 18–25% ABV. Rice wines are used in East Asian, Southeast Asian and South Asian gastronomy at formal dinners and banquets and in cooking.

History 
The production of rice wine has thousands of years of history. In ancient China, rice wine was the primary alcoholic drink. The first known fermented beverage in the world was a wine made from rice and honey about 9,000 years ago in central China. In the Shang Dynasty (1750-1100 BCE), funerary objects routinely featured wine vessels. The production of rice wine in Japan is believed to have started around third century BCE, after the introduction of wet rice cultivation. 

In the first century BCE, Alexander the Great's expedition to India caused the Roman Empire to begin the importation of rice wine.

Production 
Despite being called a wine, the rice wine's production process is more similar to that of brewing beer. The specific approaches to making rice wine vary by type. Some rice wine (such as the Chinese rice wine, or Mijiu) is made from glutinous rice, while others (such as the Japanese Sake) is made from non-glutinous rice. However, all systems combine rice with some fungal culture in some ways. The fungal culture is called jiuqu in Chinese and koji in Japanese. In the traditional Chinese rice-wine-making approach, the glutinous rice is soaked for several days before being steamed. Subsequently, rice is left to cool in a ceramic vat at near room temperature. Then, jiuqu is added and mixed with the rice. The primary functions of jiuqu is to supply enzymes to convert starch to sugar and to supply yeast for ethanol production. After a few days, the liquid formed in the ceramic vat is combined with additional mix of water and fungi to adjust the rice wine's water content.

Types of rice wines

See also

 Beer
 Rice wine cup
 Japanese rice wine
 Korean alcoholic beverages
 Chinese alcoholic beverages

References

Further reading
 Campbell-Platt, Geoffrey (2009). Food Science and Technology. John Wiley & Sons. pp. 86–91.

External links 
 Cambodian Rice Wine and Sra Sor Story. 26 June 2021. Sam Inspire.

 
Rice drinks
Fermented drinks
Alcoholic drinks